Mario Moccia is the current director of athletics for New Mexico State University. He previously served as athletic director for Southern Illinois University Carbondale from 2006 to 2014, as an associate athletic director at the University of Missouri from 1998 to 2006, as an associate athletic director at Southwest Texas State University from 1997 to 1998, and as an assistant athletic director at the University of New Mexico from 1993 to 1997. Moccia attended college at New Mexico State University, where he played on the New Mexico State Aggies baseball team.

New Mexico State 
Moccia was named athletic director at New Mexico State University on November 24, 2014.

He signed a new five-year contract in July 2019 which runs through the 2023-24 academic year and pays him $280,000 annually.

References

External links
 
New Mexico State Aggies bio

Living people
Southern Illinois Salukis athletic directors
New Mexico State Aggies athletic directors
New Mexico State Aggies baseball players
Niagara Falls Rapids players
1967 births